Óscar Nadin Díaz Gonzalez, known as Óscar Díaz (born 29 January 1984) is a Paraguayan former footballer who played as centre-back or wing-back.

Club career
Díaz previously played for FC Saturn Ramenskoye and FC Rubin Kazan in the Russian Premier League.

References

External links
Profile at BDFA

1984 births
Sportspeople from Luque
Living people
Paraguayan footballers
Paraguay under-20 international footballers
Association football defenders
12 de Octubre Football Club players
FC Saturn Ramenskoye players
FC Rubin Kazan players
Deportes Quindío footballers
Sportivo Trinidense footballers
Cerro Porteño players
Club León footballers
Club Presidente Hayes footballers
América de Cali footballers
Deportivo Pereira footballers
Club Atlético 3 de Febrero players
C.S. Herediano footballers
Independiente F.B.C. footballers
Ayacucho FC footballers
Russian Premier League players
Liga de Expansión MX players
Categoría Primera A players
Liga FPD players
Paraguayan Primera División players
Peruvian Primera División players
Bolivian Primera División players
Paraguayan expatriate footballers
Expatriate footballers in Russia
Paraguayan expatriate sportspeople in Russia
Expatriate footballers in Colombia
Paraguayan expatriate sportspeople in Colombia
Expatriate footballers in Mexico
Paraguayan expatriate sportspeople in Mexico
Expatriate footballers in Costa Rica
Paraguayan expatriate sportspeople in Costa Rica
Expatriate footballers in Peru
Paraguayan expatriate sportspeople in Peru
Expatriate footballers in Bolivia
Paraguayan expatriate sportspeople in Bolivia